Balmain Observer and Western Suburbs Advertiser was a newspaper published in Balmain, New South Wales, Australia from 1880 to 1984.

History
The paper began as The Balmain independent and Leichhardt observer in 1880. The proprietors included T. Preston, W.S. Ford & W.C. Macdougall. The newspaper's office was in Darling Street, Balmain and it was circulated in the Sydney suburbs of Balmain, Drummoyne, Leichhardt, Annandale, Sydney, Petersham, Summer Hill, Ashfield, Glebe, Ryde and Five Dock.

Digitisation
This paper has been digitised as part of the Australian Newspapers Digitisation Program project of the National Library of Australia.

See also
 List of newspapers in Australia
 List of newspapers in New South Wales

References

External links
 

Defunct newspapers published in Sydney
Newspapers established in 1880
Balmain, New South Wales
Publications disestablished in 1984
1880 establishments in Australia
1984 disestablishments in Australia